Rougnat is a commune in the Creuse department in the Nouvelle-Aquitaine region in central France.

Geography

Population

Sights
 The church of St. Laurent, dating from the twelfth century.
 A dolmen.
 Vestiges of a Roman villa at Cujasseix.
 The fifteenth-century Bodeau castle.

See also
Communes of the Creuse department

References

Communes of Creuse